The Case of Ingegerd Bremssen (Swedish: Fallet Ingegerd Bremssen) is a 1942 Swedish drama film directed by Anders Henrikson and starring Sonja Wigert, Henrikson, Dagmar Ebbesen and Gösta Cederlund. It was based on a 1937 novel of the same title by Dagmar Edqvist. It was shot at the Sundbyberg Studios in Stockholm. The film's sets were designed by the art director Max Linder.

Synopsis
A young nurse Ingegerd Bremssen is assaulted and raped on a lonely road. She is taken to hospital but is extremely traumatised by the attack, and it leads to the breakdown of her engagement with a young army Lieutenant. From a staunchly conservative background she believes her honour has been violated and her life is impossible to rebuild. When she encounters her rapist again she shoots him dead. Placed on trial she is ultimately acquitted thanks to the sympathetic intervention of a psychologist.

Cast
 Sonja Wigert as 	Ingegerd Bremssen
 Anders Henrikson as 	Dr. Thomas Arnholm
 Dagmar Ebbesen as 	Nurse Monica
 Gösta Cederlund as 	Harald Fors
 Olga Andersson as 	Mrs. Bremssen
 Marianne Löfgren as 	Kristin Mårtensson
 Nils Lundell as 	Lilja
 Georg Rydeberg as 	Lt. Walter von Baden
 Carl Barcklind as Judge Ericsson
 Ivar Kåge as 	Chief Physician
 Gunnar Olsson as 	Nilsson
 Gunnar Sjöberg as Dr. Ivarsson
 Vera Lindby as 	Hamnbojan
 Ingrid Luterkort as 	Nurse Kerstin
 Emmy Albiin as 	Aunt Marie
 Frithiof Bjärne as 	Hallin 
 Birgitta Arman as 	Nurse
 Ingrid Backlin as 	Friend of Ingegerd 
 Josua Bengtson as 	Guard 
 Ann-Margret Bergendahl as 	Friend of Ingegerd
 Helga Brofeldt as 	Woman in court 
 Åke Claesson as 	Procecutor 
 Julia Cæsar as 	Train passenger 
 Axel Högel as Train passenger 
 Isa Palmgren as 	Sigrid 
 Curt Masreliez as 	Young Man 
 Carl Ström as 	Doctor 
 Siv Thulin as 	Friend of Ingegerd
 Gerd Mårtensson as 	Nurse

References

Bibliography 
 Brunsdale, Mitzi M. Encyclopedia of Nordic Crime Fiction: Works and Authors of Denmark, Finland, Iceland, Norway and Sweden Since 1967. McFarland, 2016.

External links 
 

1942 films
Swedish drama films
1942 drama films
1940s Swedish-language films
Films directed by Anders Henrikson
Films based on Swedish novels
1940s Swedish films